The following outline is provided as an overview of and topical guide to Saskatchewan:

Saskatchewan was first explored by Europeans in 1690 and settled in 1774; prior to that, it was populated by several indigenous tribes. It became a province in 1905. Saskatchewan's major industries are agriculture, mining, and energy. The province's name is derived from the Saskatchewan River. The river is designated kisiskāciwani-sīpiy ("swift flowing river") in the Cree language.

General reference 
 Pronunciation: 
 Common English name(s): Saskatchewan or "SK" or "Sask"
 Official English name: Saskatchewan
 Common endonym(s): "Land of Living Skies"
 Official endonym(s): Province of Saskatchewan
 Adjectival(s): Saskatchewan
 Demonym(s): Saskatchewan
 Etymology: The province's name is derived from the Saskatchewan River. Earlier, the river was designated kisiskāciwani-sīpiy ("swift flowing river") in the Cree language.

Geography of Saskatchewan 

Geography of Saskatchewan
 Saskatchewan is: a province of Canada
 Canada is: a country
 Location:
 Northern Hemisphere, Western Hemisphere
 Americas
 North America
 Northern America
 Canada
 Extreme points of Saskatchewan
 Population of Saskatchewan: 1,003,299 (est.)
 Area of Saskatchewan:  
 Statistics of Saskatchewan
 Symbols of Saskatchewan
 Atlas of Saskatchewan
 Territorial evolution of Canada
 Time zones (Time in Saskatchewan): Central Time Zone:  CST (UTC−06) or CDT (UTC−05)

Environment of Saskatchewan 

 Climate of Saskatchewan
 Geology of Saskatchewan
 Wildlife of Saskatchewan
 Flora of Saskatchewan
 Fauna of Saskatchewan
 Mammals of Saskatchewan

Natural geographic features of Saskatchewan 
 Lakes of Saskatchewan
 Rivers of Saskatchewan
 World Heritage Sites in Saskatchewan

Regions of Saskatchewan

Administrative divisions of Saskatchewan 

 Census divisions of Saskatchewan
 SARM divisions
 School districts in Saskatchewan

Municipalities of Saskatchewan 

List of communities in Saskatchewan
 Rural municipalities
 Cities of Saskatchewan
 Towns in Saskatchewan
 Villages in Saskatchewan
 Hamlets in Saskatchewan
 Ghost towns in Saskatchewan
 Indian Reserves in Saskatchewan

Demography of Saskatchewan 

Demographics of Saskatchewan

Government and politics of Saskatchewan 

Politics of Saskatchewan
 Form of government: Constitutional monarchy
 Capital of Saskatchewan: Regina
 Elections in Saskatchewan
 First Nations in Saskatchewan
 Political parties in Saskatchewan
 Political scandals of Saskatchewan
 List of leaders of the opposition in Saskatchewan

Representation in the government of Canada 

members of the Upper House are called Senators
 Saskatchewan senators

Members of the lower house are referred to as Members of Parliament MP
 Canadian federal electoral districts in Saskatchewan
 Historical federal electoral districts of Canada

Branches of the government of Saskatchewan 

Government of Saskatchewan

Executive branch 
 Head of state: Lieutenant-Governor of Saskatchewan - List of Saskatchewan lieutenant-governors, (Monarchy in Saskatchewan)
 Head of government: Premier of Saskatchewan, List of premiers of Saskatchewan
 Cabinet of Saskatchewan

Legislative branch 
 Parliament: Legislative Assembly of Saskatchewan (unicameral)
Members of the Legislative Assembly (MLA)
List of Saskatchewan political parties
List of Saskatchewan provincial electoral districts

Judicial branch

 Court of Appeal for Saskatchewan
 Court of King's Bench for Saskatchewan
 Provincial Court of Saskatchewan
History of Saskatchewan Courts

Interprovincial relations

Interprovincial organization membership 

Saskatchewan is a member of:
 Trade, Investment and Labour Mobility Agreement (TILMA)

Law of Saskatchewan 

 The Saskatchewan Act
 Criminal Code
 Capital punishment in Saskatchewan: none.
 Canada eliminated the death penalty for murder nationwide on July 14, 1976.
 Human rights in Saskatchewan
 LGBT rights in Saskatchewan
 Same-sex marriage in Saskatchewan
 Law enforcement in Saskatchewan
 Saskatchewan Provincial Police (defunct)
 Royal Canadian Mounted Police

History of Saskatchewan 

History of Saskatchewan

By period 
Rupert's Land  1670 to 1870
Territorial evolution of Canada 1870-1905
District of Assiniboia  1882-1905
District of Saskatchewan  1882-1905
District of Athabasca  1882-1905
 North-West Rebellion 1885
 Provisional Government of Saskatchewan

By region

By subject 
 History of courts in Saskatchewan
 Ghost towns in Saskatchewan

Culture of Saskatchewan 

Culture of Saskatchewan
 Cuisine of Saskatchewan
 Canadian Chinese cuisine
 Provincial symbols of Saskatchewan
 Coat of arms of Saskatchewan
 Flag of Saskatchewan
 World Heritage Sites in Saskatchewan

The Arts in Saskatchewan 
 Music of Saskatchewan

Sports in Saskatchewan 

Sport in Saskatchewan
 Cricket in Saskatchewan
 Curling in Saskatchewan
 Hockey in Saskatchewan
 Football in Saskatchewan
 Canadian Football League
 Saskatchewan Roughriders
 Rugby in Saskatchewan
 Skiing in Saskatchewan
 Soccer in Saskatchewan

Economy and infrastructure of Saskatchewan

Economy of Saskatchewan
 Agriculture in Saskatchewan
 Currency of Saskatchewan:
 Health care in Saskatchewan
Father of medicare
 Tourism in Saskatchewan
 Transportation in Saskatchewan
 Airports in Saskatchewan
 Roads in Saskatchewan
Highways
 Railways
Coal mining in Saskatchewan

Education in Saskatchewan

Education in Saskatchewan
 List of Saskatchewan school divisions
 Higher education in Saskatchewan
 Colleges in Saskatchewan
 Universities in Saskatchewan
University of Regina
 University of Saskatchewan
 University of Saskatchewan academics
 Alumni-related
 List of University of Saskatchewan alumni

See also 

 Outline of geography
 Outline of Canada
 Outline of Alberta
 Outline of British Columbia
 Outline of Manitoba
 Outline of Nova Scotia
 Outline of Ontario
 Outline of Prince Edward Island
 Outline of Quebec
 Index of Saskatchewan-related articles (alphabetical index)

References

External links 

 Government of Saskatchewan
 
 CBC Digital Archives - Saskatchewan @ 100
 Royal Canadian Mounted Police
 Saskatchewan!
 SaskTourism

 1
 
Saskatchewan
Saskatchewan